The 2021 season was the 107th season in the existence of Clube Atlético Mineiro and the 15th consecutive season in the top flight of Brazilian football. In addition to the national league, Atlético Mineiro participated in the Campeonato Mineiro, the Copa do Brasil and the Copa Libertadores.

The season was regarded as one of the most successful in the club's history, with the conquests of their second Campeonato Brasileiro, second Copa do Brasil and 46th Campeonato Mineiro titles, claiming them their first domestic treble.

Season overview
February
On 25 February, Jorge Sampaoli stepped down as Atlético's manager and on the following day the club named assistant coach Lucas Gonçalves to the position on an interim basis.

On 28 February, Atlético made their season debut in a Campeonato Mineiro 3–0 win over URT. Victor made his last appearance for the club in this match, having announced his retirement the day before.

March
On 5 March, Cuca was appointed head coach of the first team.

April
On 21 April, Atlético made their debut in the Copa Libertadores, drawing 1–1 away to Deportivo La Guaira.

On 24 April, the team concluded their Campeonato Mineiro first stage campaign as leaders, with nine victories and two defeats.

May
On 22 May, Atlético were crowned the Campeonato Mineiro champions after drawing 0–0 in both legs of the final against América.

On 25 May, they beat Deportivo La Guaira 4–0 at the Mineirão, concluding their Copa Libertadores group stage run with the best overall campaign, with five wins and one draw.

On 30 May, the team made their debut in the Campeonato Brasileiro, a 2–1 home loss to Fortaleza.

June
On 2 June, Atlético debuted in the Copa do Brasil third round, beating Remo away 2–0. On 10 June, they secured a spot in the round of 16 after besting their opponents yet again, this time 2–1 at home.

July
On 20 July, following two 0–0 draws, Atlético knocked Boca Juniors out of the Libertadores round of 16 in the penalty shootouts; Everson saved two kicks as Atlético won 3–1. This was the first time a Brazilian team was able to beat Boca Juniors in the penalty shootouts of a Libertadores match, after five consecutive wins by the Argentines in previous encounters.

August
On 4 August, Atlético qualified for the Copa do Brasil quarter-finals after beating Bahia 3–2 in the aggregate score of the round of 16 clash.

On 8 August, Atlético became leaders of the league for the first time following a 2–1 away victory over Juventude.

On 11 August, the team clinched a 1–0 away win against River Plate in the first leg of the Libertadores quarter-finals. One week later, in the team's first game with an attendance since March 2020 at the Mineirão, they beat the Argentines again, this time by a 3–0 score. This marked only the second time a team knocked out both River Plate and Boca Juniors in the same edition of the competition, following Independiente del Valle in 2016.

September
On 15 September, Atlético overcame Fluminense in the Copa do Brasil quarter-finals with a 3–1 win on aggregate.

On 28 September, the team was knocked out in the semi-finals of the Copa Libertadores by Palmeiras on the away goal rule, after 0–0 away draw in the first leg and a 1–1 score at home in the second.

October
On 17 October, the team ended an 18-game unbeaten run in the league after suffering a 2–1 defeat away to Atlético Goianiense.

On 20 October, they bested Fortaleza with a 4–0 home victory in the semi-finals of the Copa do Brasil. A week later, an additional 2–1 win in the second leg secured the team a place in the final.

November
Atlético finished the month of November with six wins and a draw in the league, with ten points ahead of second placed Flamengo.

December
On 2 December, Atlético were crowned the 2021 Campeonato Brasileiro Série A champions in a thrilling contest away against Bahia: after going 2–0 down at the start of the second half, the team responded scoring three goals in an interval of five minutes, first with Hulk from a penalty kick and then with a brace from Keno. The 3–2 turnaround win secured Atlético the second national league title in the club's history, 50 years after the first win.

On 12 December, Atlético beat Athletico Paranaense 4–0 in the first leg of the Copa do Brasil final at the Mineirão. Three days later, a 2–1 win at the Arena da Baixada earned the club the second national cup trophy in its history.

Players

First team squad

Other players with first team appearances

Transfers

In

Loan returnees

Out

Loans out

Transfer summary
Undisclosed fees are not included in the transfer totals.

Expenditure

Total:  €6,170,000

Income

Total:  €8,800,000

Net total

Total:  €2,630,000

Competitions

Overview

Campeonato Mineiro

First stage

Matches

Knockout stage

Semi-finals

Finals

Copa Libertadores

Round of 16 

The draw for the round of 16 was held on 1 June 2021.

Quarter-finals

Semi-finals

Campeonato Brasileiro

Standings

Result by round

Matches

Copa do Brasil

Third round

Round of 16

Quarter-finals

Semi-finals

Finals

Statistics

Squad appearances and goals
Last updated on 15 December 2021.

|-
! colspan="14" style="background:#dcdcdc; text-align:center"|Goalkeepers

|-
! colspan="14" style="background:#dcdcdc; text-align:center"|Defenders

|-
! colspan="14" style="background:#dcdcdc; text-align:center"|Midfielders

|-
! colspan="14" style="background:#dcdcdc; text-align:center"|Forwards

|-
! colspan=14 style=background:#dcdcdc; text-align:center|Players who have made an appearance this season but have left the club

|}

Notes

References

External links

Clube Atlético Mineiro seasons
Atlético Mineiro